Wandsworth Road railway station is a National Rail station between Battersea and Clapham in south London.

History

The station opened on 1 March 1863, on the London, Chatham and Dover Railway original double-track low-level route from Victoria via Stewarts Lane, which was opened between Victoria and Herne Hill, on 25 August 1862. The same railway company constructed a triple-track high-level route between Battersea Pier Junction and Brixton, part of which opened between Factory Junction, (100 metres north of Wandsworth Road station) and Brixton on 1 May 1866 together with three additional platforms at Wandsworth Road. Therefore, from May 1866 until April 1916, this station had five platforms. On 1 May 1867, the London, Chatham and Dover Railway leased the original two tracks to the London, Brighton and South Coast Railway (LBSCR), for use by its new South London line service (which run between Victoria and London Bridge via Denmark Hill). On 3 April 1916, the three 1866 platforms were closed, as the South Eastern & Chatham railway withdrew its service, leaving only the original two 1863 platforms, which were still served by the LBSCR. These platforms closed on 19 May 1926. The LBSCR platforms reopened on 20 September 1926. The former South Eastern & Chatham platforms which closed in 1916 were demolished in the late 1920s. Therefore, the current two platforms served by London Overground are the original platforms of 1863.

A footbridge was installed by Network SouthEast in November 1988 having previously been used at Mitcham.

Services

Former services

This was replaced by London Overground's service between Clapham Junction and Highbury & Islington.

This was withdrawn in December 2012. Since then the service was instead been cut back to Wandsworth Road from Kensington Olympia, and then withdrawn completely in June 2013, following the ratification of the service withdrawal request by the Department for Transport and Office of Rail and Road.

Connections
London Buses routes 77, 87 and 452 and night route N87 serve the station.

References

External links

Railway stations in the London Borough of Lambeth
Former London, Chatham and Dover Railway stations
Railway stations in Great Britain opened in 1863
Railway stations served by London Overground